Paolo Gozzi Iweru (born 25 April 2001) is an Italian professional footballer who plays as a defender for  club Pescara on loan from Genoa.

Club career

Juventus 
On 13 April 2019, Gozzi made his Juventus debut in a 2–1 away loss against SPAL in the Serie A.

Juventus U23 
Gozzi's first game for Juventus U23, the reserve team of Juventus, came on 28 October 2020, in a 2–1 Serie C defeat against Como.

Loan to Fuenlabrada 
On 21 July 2021, Gozzi moved to Segunda División side Fuenlabrada on a season-long loan.

He played his first game for the Spanish side on 21 August, starting in a 2-0 away win against AD Alcorcón.

Genoa, loans to Cosenza and Pescara
On 19 August 2022, Juventus announced to have sold Gozzi to Genoa on a permanent move. Shortly afterwards, Serie B club Cosenza announced to have signed him on loan from Genoa. The loan was terminated early on 31 January 2023. On the same day, Gozzi was loaned to Pescara.

International career
Gozzi was born in Italy and is of Nigerian descent; he is a youth international for Italy.

With the Italy U19 team, he took part in the 2019 UEFA European Under-19 Championship.

References

External links
 

2001 births
Living people
Footballers from Turin
Italian people of Nigerian descent
Italian sportspeople of African descent
Italian footballers
Association football defenders
Juventus F.C. players
Juventus Next Gen players
CF Fuenlabrada footballers
Genoa C.F.C. players
Cosenza Calcio players
Delfino Pescara 1936 players
Serie A players
Serie B players
Serie C players
Segunda División players
Italy youth international footballers
Italian expatriate footballers
Italian expatriate sportspeople in Spain
Expatriate footballers in Spain